Lajos Homonnai (born 2 May 1904, date of death unknown) was a Hungarian water polo player who competed at the 1924 Summer Olympics. Born in Budapest, he was part of the Hungarian team in the 1924 tournament, in which he played three matches.

References

1904 births
Year of death missing
Hungarian male water polo players
Olympic water polo players of Hungary
Water polo players at the 1924 Summer Olympics
Water polo players from Budapest
20th-century Hungarian people